= Abubekov =

Abubekov (Russian: Абубе́ков; masculine) or Abubekova (Абубе́кова; feminine) is a Russian surname. It derives from a patronymic which in turn derives from the Turkic male given name Abubek—from Arabic "abū bakr", after Abu Bakr, a senior companion of the Islamic prophet Muhammad. The given name is popular among Sunni Muslims.
